Alan Opie  (born 22 March 1945 in Redruth, Cornwall, England) is an English baritone, primarily known as an opera singer.

Education
He attended Truro School and went to Gonville and Caius College, Cambridge University as a choral student in 1963. He also studied at the Guildhall School of Music and Drama and the London Opera Centre before joining the Sadler's Wells Opera (now the English National Opera, ENO). He became a Principal baritone there while still a student.

Opera career
Opie has also sung with the other major UK opera companies Scottish Opera, Opera North, Glyndebourne Festival Opera and the Royal Opera House, Covent Garden. Internationally, he has performed in the opera houses of Paris, Amsterdam, Vienna, Brussels, Berlin, Chicago and Santa Fe and regularly appears at the Bayerische Staatsoper in Munich. He has also sung at the Bayreuth Festival. In 1996, Opie switched his status at the ENO from company member to regular guest, enabling him to make his début at La Scala, Milan. There he created the role of Outis in the opera of the same name by Luciano Berio. 

In March 2017, he performed the role of Arbace in Mozart's Idomeneo at the Metropolitan Opera in New York.

He has recorded for CBS, EMI, Hyperion, Chandos and Decca, winning Grammy Awards in 1996 and 1998 for his involvement in, respectively, recordings of Britten's Peter Grimes and Wagner's Die Meistersinger von Nürnberg.

Awards
In 1997, his performance in the title role of Verdi's Falstaff earned Opie a nomination for the 1998 Laurence Olivier Award for Outstanding Achievement in Opera. He was appointed Officer of the Order of the British Empire (OBE) in the 2013 Birthday Honours for services to music.

Personal life
Opie and his wife Kathleen (married since 1970) have a son and a daughter.

Operatic roles
Performed and/or recorded, listed alphabetically:

Selected concert works 
(performed and/or recorded, listed alphabetically)

Selected discography 
Grammy Award-winning recordings in bold.

References

Sources

External links
 Rayfield Allied profile

1945 births
English operatic baritones
Musicians from Cornwall
Living people
People from Redruth
Grammy Award winners
Officers of the Order of the British Empire
People educated at Truro School
Alumni of Gonville and Caius College, Cambridge
Alumni of the Guildhall School of Music and Drama
20th-century British male opera singers
21st-century British male opera singers